Carmi Municipal Airport is a public-use civil airport located in and owned by the city of Carmi, Illinois. The airport is near Illinois' border with Indiana and the Wabash River. The closest major airport is Evansville Regional Airport, 28 miles to the east.

Facilities
Carmi Municipal Airport has one runway: runway 18/36 is 4000 x 75 ft (1213 x 23 m) and is made of asphalt. The City of Carmi operates an FBO on the airport with vending machines, cooking equipment, courtesy cars, lounges, work stations, a conference room, and restrooms. Self-serve fuel and tiedowns available at the airport.

Aircraft
For the 12-month period ending March 31, 2021, the airport averages 37 aircraft operations per day, or about 13,500 per year. This traffic is comprised completely of general aviation. There are 20 aircraft based at the field: 19 single-engine and 1 multiengine.

References 

Airports in Illinois